Tim Reilly is an American baseball coach and former catcher, who is the current pitching coach for the Navy Midshipmen. He played college baseball at Rutgers for coach Fred Hill from 2006 to 2009. He served as the head coach of the Lafayette Leopards (2021–2022).

Playing career
Raised in Egg Harbor City, New Jersey, Reilly attended Holy Spirit High School, where he played baseball before graduating in 2005. Following graduation, Reilly enrolled at Rutgers University, where he would be a member of the baseball team.

As a freshman at Rutgers, Reilly did not appear in any games. As a sophomore, he appeared in three games, where he had two at bats with no hits. He would go 0 for 2 as a junior as well, in 4 appearances at catcher. As a senior, he made 7 starts in 16 games, where he had a .211 batting average, a .375 on-base percentage (OBP) and a .263 slugging percentage.

Coaching career
In 2011, Reilly was named an assistant coach for the Rider Broncs baseball team, working with hitters, catchers and coaching third base. In the fall of 2011, Reilly returned to Rutgers to become a volunteer assistant working with catchers. On August 17, 2017, Reilly was named the hitting and recruiting coordinator for the Lafayette Leopards.

When head coach Joe Kinney announced the fall of 2019, that the 2020 season would be his last before retiring, the college announced that Reilly would named head coach on July 1, 2020. After just two seasons, Lafayette announced that they would be going in a different direction, ending Reilly's tenure. Reilly was soon named the Pitching coach at Navy.

Head coaching record

References

External links
Lafayette Leopards bio

Living people
Baseball catchers
Baseball players from New Jersey
Rider Broncs baseball players
Rutgers Scarlet Knights baseball coaches
Lafayette Leopards baseball coaches
Navy Midshipmen baseball coaches
Holy Spirit High School (New Jersey) alumni
People from Egg Harbor City, New Jersey
Sportspeople from Atlantic County, New Jersey
Year of birth missing (living people)
Rutgers Scarlet Knights baseball players